The St. Joseph's Catholic Church is a site on the National Register of Historic Places located at the D'Aste Townsite.  It was added to the Register on March 18, 1999.

It is a wood frame church built in 1916, with elements of Craftsman architecture. The church stands by itself along a graveled county road.

Gallery

References

Churches on the National Register of Historic Places in Montana
Roman Catholic churches completed in 1916
American Craftsman architecture in Montana
Former Roman Catholic church buildings in Montana
National Register of Historic Places in Lake County, Montana
20th-century Roman Catholic church buildings in the United States